Robert Eugene Richie (born September 5, 1965) is former Major League Baseball left fielder who played for the Detroit Tigers in 1989.

Richie was considered a top prospect. But he shocked the Tigers when he announced after the 1989 season that he was retiring to become a probation officer and to be able to focus more on his faith as a Jehovah’s Witness.

References

External links
, or Retrosheet, or Pura Pelota (Venezuelan Winter League)

1965 births
Living people
African-American baseball players
Baseball players from Nevada
Bristol Tigers players
Detroit Tigers players
Glens Falls Tigers players
Lakeland Tigers players
Major League Baseball left fielders
Navegantes del Magallanes players
American expatriate baseball players in Venezuela
Nevada Wolf Pack baseball players
Sportspeople from Reno, Nevada
Toledo Mud Hens players
21st-century African-American people
20th-century African-American sportspeople
Alaska Goldpanners of Fairbanks players